Richard Dudley Sears (October 26, 1861 – April 8, 1943) was an American tennis player, who won the US National Championships singles in its first seven years, from 1881 to 1887, and the doubles for six years from 1882 to 1887, after which he retired from tennis.

Early life
He was the son of Frederic Richard Sears and Albertina Homer Shelton. His brothers Philip and Herbert were also tennis players.

Tennis career
Sears learned to play tennis in 1879. Sears played his first tournament and won his first title at the Beacon Park Championships held at Beacon Park in Boston in October 1880. He was undefeated in the U.S. Championships, he won the first of his seven consecutive titles in 1881 while still a student at Harvard. In those days, the previous year's winner had an automatic place in the final. Starting in the 1881 first round, he went on an 18-match unbeaten streak that took him through the 1887 championships, after which he retired from the game. Not until 1921 was his 18-match unbeaten run overtaken (by Bill Tilden). During his first three championships, Sears did not lose a single set. Sears was the first 19-year-old to win in the U.S., slightly older than Oliver Campbell in 1890 and Pete Sampras in 1990.

Although primarily remembered for his grand slam titles he did compete in and win other titles. He won his first tournament at Beacon Park in Boston in 1880, defeating Edward Gray. In May 1883, he reached the semifinals of the Longwood Bowl in Boston, losing to James Dwight by a walkover. In 1884 he traveled to Europe to play tournaments in Great Britain and Ireland. At the second major tournament of the 19th century the Irish Championships, held in Dublin he reached the quarterfinals before losing to eventual champion Herbert Lawford in three sets. Sears had to withdraw from the West of England Championships held at Bath due to a foot injury but in June he reached the final of the East Gloucestershire Championships held at Cheltenham, losing in three sets to Donald Stewart. 

He then traveled to Manchester to compete at the second most important English tournament at the time the Northern Championships where he also reached the quarterfinals, again losing to Stewart. Unable to compete at the Wimbledon Championships due to a wrist injury he returned to the United States in July after the U.S. Championships he entered the U.S. National Collegiate Championships in Hartford, Connecticut, where he reached the semi-finals. In June 1885 he won the Middle States Championships in Hoboken, New Jersey, defeating Howard Taylor.

Sears was the first U.S. No. 1 in the USLTA rankings, when they began in 1885 and retained the ranking in 1886 and 1887.

After giving up playing lawn tennis, Sears won the U.S. Court Tennis singles title in 1892 and also served as USTA president in 1887 and 1888.

Personal life
Sears married Eleanor M. Cochrane on November 24, 1891, and they had two children, Richard Dudley Sears Jr. and Miriam Sears. He died on April 8, 1943. His grandson was the Massachusetts politician John W. Sears.

Legacy
Sears was inducted in the International Tennis Hall of Fame in 1955.

Grand Slam finals

Singles (7 titles)

Doubles (6 titles)

References

External links

 
 

 

19th-century American people
19th-century male tennis players
American male tennis players
American real tennis players
Harvard Crimson men's tennis players
The Harvard Lampoon alumni
Harvard University alumni
Tennis players from Boston
International Tennis Hall of Fame inductees
United States National champions (tennis)
1861 births
1943 deaths
Grand Slam (tennis) champions in men's singles
Grand Slam (tennis) champions in men's doubles